Garmdarreh (also Romanized as Garm Darreh; also known as Garmdarreh-ye Pā'īn) is one of the five cities in the Central District of Karaj County, Alborz province, Iran. At the 2006 census, its population was 12,738 in 3,329 households. The latest census in 2016 counted 22,726 people in 7,129 households.

References 

Karaj County

Cities in Alborz Province

Populated places in Alborz Province

Populated places in Karaj County